Gregory Byrne Whitby KSG AM (born 1 August 1952) is an Australian educator. He currently serves as the Executive Director of Catholic Education Diocese of Parramatta, a system made up of more than 80 schools across Greater Western Sydney and the Blue Mountains, a position which he has held since 2006.

Whitby started his career as a teacher in 1974, serving in a variety of school leadership positions before taking up his current role as Executive Director of Catholic Education Diocese of Parramatta. In 2018, he was recognised with an Order of Australia (AM) award for his outstanding contribution to education and the transformation of schooling for young people across Greater Western Sydney. Whitby regularly writes for The Daily Telegraph in his weekly column which touches on issues affecting the education industry.

Early career
Whitby started his career as a classroom teacher in 1974. In 1976, he moved to Liverpool Boys High School where he taught English and History. Whitby's leadership career started to take shape in 1982 when he was appointed as the English and History Coordinator at John Therry Catholic High School. Whitby moved out of the classroom and into an administrative role in 1985 as the Assistant to the Principal at Patrician Brothers College, then becoming the Executive Assistant to the Executive Director of Catholic Education Diocese of Parramatta for a period of four years.

In 1992, Whitby returned to the classroom as Principal of Emmaus Catholic College until being appointed as the Head of Curriculum and Special Programs at Catholic Education Diocese of Parramatta. In 1999, Whitby became the Executive Director of Schools for the Diocese of Wollongong, a position which he held for 7 years until being appointed as the Executive Director of Catholic Education Diocese of Parramatta.

Activism and public profile

Whitby writes extensively on various issues and topics surrounding the education industry. His contribution to the public debate on topics ranging from mobile phones through to classroom design is syndicated across 22 NewsLocal papers in New South Wales, including The Daily Telegraph. Whitby has penned a number of opinion pieces for the Sydney Morning Herald on issues including bullying, selective schools and technology.

As an outspoken voice on issues including the New South Wales ATAR and Higher School Certificate examinations, Whitby has earned a public profile which sees regular contributions to the public dialogue surrounding transformation within the education space.

Whitby is the author of Educating Gen Wi-fi, which argues for the need to rethink the nature of learning and teaching in a connected world. Whitby appeared in a public service announcement with Daniel H. Pink (author of Whole New Mind) and other key thinkers on re-imagining schooling for the 21st century. He also maintains an active social media presence through Twitter.

Awards
In 2007, Greg Whitby was named as the most innovative and creative educator in Australia by the Bulletin Magazine in its annual Smart 100 Awards. In the same year, he received a Presidential Citation from the Australian Council for Educational Leaders (ACEL) of which he has been a Fellow since 2002.

In 2011, he presented the AW Jones Oration for the Australian College of Educators, South Australian branch on the changing nature of schooling in today's world. He was named Apple Distinguished Educator "for his contribution to the implementation of Learning Technologies in Education".

In 2012, Greg Whitby was appointed Knight of the Knight the Order of St Gregory the Great for his contribution to Catholic schooling.

He was also the recipient of the 2017 Sir Harold Wyndham Medal awarded by the Australian College of Educators to those who have made an outstanding contribution to the education of young people in New South Wales.

References

Sources
 (includes photo of Whitby)
Greg Whitby interview, abc.net.au, 29 June 2007
$1.9m boost, parramatta.yourguide.com.au, 28 May 2008

Funky School, theaustralian.com.au, 10–11 September 2011

Australian educators
Australian Roman Catholics
Living people
1952 births
Knights of St. Gregory the Great
People from Sydney
Roman Catholic Diocese of Parramatta
Members of the Order of Australia
People educated at Oakhill College